Josh Miller (born September 23, 1978), sometimes credited under the alias Worm Miller, is an American filmmaker, writer, director, and actor.  He often collaborates with his high school friend Patrick Casey. He is best known for creating the Fox animated series Golan the Insatiable and writing the Sonic the Hedgehog film, as well as directing the cult horror-comedy Hey, Stop Stabbing Me!. He is the host and co-founder of the long-running Los Angeles-based horror screening series Friday Night Frights.

Filmography

Film

Acting roles

Television

References

External links
 
 Amazon.com Author Page 

1978 births
American male film actors
American male screenwriters
Living people
Male actors from Minneapolis
Writers from Minneapolis
Film directors from Minnesota
Screenwriters from Minnesota